Santa Cruz de la Palma (Spanish for Holy Cross of La Palma) is a city and a municipality on the east coast of the island of La Palma in the province of Santa Cruz de Tenerife of the Canary Islands. Santa Cruz de la Palma is the second-largest city (after Los Llanos de Aridane) and is the capital of the island. It is along an old lava flow coming from the Caldereta (small caldera), a volcano just south of the city.

The population of the municipality is 16,330 (2013), its area is 43.38 km2.  Around 13,000 people live within the city limits, with the remaining population residing in other settlements.

History
The city was founded by Alonso Fernández de Lugo on May 3, 1493.  It was located between a river which is situated by a cave named Tedote (now Cueva de Carías, located north of the city).  The city, originally called Villa del Apurón, served as a port that connected routes to the Americas, exporting goods from the island such as sugarcane.  The city was sacked by pirates and was later reconstructed and fortified against future pirate attacks.  Famous fortifications include the Castillo de Santa Catalina and Castillo de la Virgen.  The economic crisis that affected the agriculture sector brought the greatest loss of population in the city's history, which limited its expansion and caused the population to stabilize and drop to 11,000.  The population did not approach its original 18,000 again for the next hundred years.

Climate
Santa Cruz de la Palma has a hot semi-arid climate (Köppen BSh) featuring very warm, almost rainless summers from April to September, and warm, rainier winters from October to March.

Tourism 
Santa Cruz de la Palma has the only major port in the island, serving ferry routes to Cádiz in Spain, as well as to Tenerife, Gran Canaria and Lanzarote. The main ferry operators in the port are Naviera Armas, Fred. Olsen Express, and Trasmediterránea. Many cruise line firms visit the port.

In Las Nieves is the Real Santuario Insular de las Virgen de las Nieves, the patron saint of the island of La Palma.

Media
 El Apurón : elapuron.com

Sport 
The football SD Tenisca rivalry with CD Mensajero is the most important derby of the island of La Palma. One of these games, played in 1983, was considered one of the most violents in the history of Spanish football.

Historical population

People
 Manolo Blahnik, shoemaker

See also
Holy Week in Santa Cruz de La Palma
List of municipalities in Santa Cruz de Tenerife

References

External links

Official website 

1493 establishments in Spain
Populated places established in the 1490s
Municipalities in La Palma